Babette's Feast is a 1987 Danish drama film directed by Gabriel Axel. The screenplay, written by Axel, was based on the 1958 story of the same name by Isak Dinesen (Karen Blixen). It was produced by Just Betzer, Bo Christensen and Benni Korzen, with funding from the Danish Film Institute.

Babette's Feast was the first Danish cinema film of a Blixen story. It was also the first Danish film to win the Oscar for Best Foreign Language Film.

The film premiered in the Un Certain Regard section of the 1987 Cannes Film Festival.

Plot 
The elderly and pious Protestant sisters Martine (Birgitte Federspiel) and Filippa (Bodil Kjer) live in a small village on the remote western coast of Jutland in 19th-century Denmark. Their late father was a pastor who founded his own Pietistic conventicle. Lacking new converts, the aging sisters preside over a dwindling, but faithful, elderly congregation.

The story flashes back 49 years, showing the sisters in their youthful loveliness. They have many suitors, but their father rejects them, as he selfishly wishes to retain the assistance of the young women to further his pastoral mission. Martine is courted by an impassioned young Swedish cavalry officer, Lorens Löwenhielm, who is visiting Jutland. Filippa is courted by a famous baritone, Achille Papin, from the Paris Opera, on hiatus to enjoy the silence of the coast. Both sisters decide to spurn their suitors and stay with their father.

Thirty-five years later, Babette Hersant (Stéphane Audran) appears at their door. She carries a letter from Papin, who in it explains that she is a refugee from counter-revolutionary bloodshed in Paris and recommends her as a housekeeper. The sisters cannot afford to employ Babette, but she begs to work for free. Babette serves as their cook for the next 14 years, producing improved versions of the bland meals typical of the abstemious nature of the congregation and slowly gaining their respect, and that of the other local inhabitants. As the years go by, the sisters are deeply distressed by the increasing number of querulous arguments between the congregants. Babette is also troubled, and at one point, interrupts the arguments with a stern rebuke.

Babette's only link to her former life is a lottery ticket. A Parisian friend annually renews the ticket. One day, she wins the lottery and receives 10,000 francs. After her win she decides to prepare a delicious dinner for the sisters and their small congregation on the occasion of the founding pastor's hundredth birthday. More than just a feast, the meal is an outpouring of Babette's appreciation, an act of self-sacrifice.

The sisters accept both Babette's meal and her offer to pay for the creation of a "real French dinner". Babette arranges for her nephew to go to Paris and gather the supplies for the feast. The ingredients are plentiful, sumptuous and exotic, and their arrival causes much consternation and discussion among the villagers. As the various never-before-seen ingredients arrive and preparations commence, the sisters begin to worry that the meal will become a sin of sensual luxury, if not some form of devilry. In a hasty conference, the sisters and the congregation agree to eat the meal, but to forgo speaking of any pleasure in it and to make no mention of the food during the dinner.

Martine's former suitor, Lorens, now a famous general married to a member of the Queen's court, comes as the guest of his aunt, the local lady of the manor and a member of the old pastor's congregation. He is unaware of the other guests' austere plans and as a man of the world and former attaché in Paris, he is the only person at the table qualified to comment on the meal. He regales the guests with abundant information about the extraordinary food and drink, comparing it to a meal he enjoyed years earlier at the famous Café Anglais in Paris. Although the other celebrants refuse to comment on the earthly pleasures of their meal, Babette's gifts break down their distrust and superstitions, elevating them physically and spiritually. Old wrongs are forgiven, ancient loves are rekindled and a mystical redemption of the human spirit settles over the table.

Bereft, the sisters assume that Babette will return to Paris. However, when she tells them that all of her money is gone and that she is not going anywhere, the sisters are aghast. Babette then reveals that she was formerly the head chef of the Café Anglais, where a dinner for 12 cost 10,000 francs. Martine tearfully says, "Now you will be poor the rest of your life", to which Babette replies, "An artist is never poor."  Filippa then says: "But this is not the end, Babette. In paradise you will be the great artist God meant you to be" and then embraces her with tears in her eyes saying: "Oh, how you will enchant the angels!", which is precisely how the short story ends.

Cast 

 Stéphane Audran as Babette Hersant
 Bodil Kjer as Filippa (old)
 Birgitte Federspiel as Martine (old)
 Jarl Kulle as General Lorens Löwenhielm (old)
 Jean-Philippe Lafont as Achille Papin
 Vibeke Hastrup as Martine (young)
 Hanne Stensgaard as Filippa (young)
 Tina Kiberg as Filippa (singing voice)
 Gudmar Wivesson as Lorens (young)
 Bibi Andersson as Swedish courtier
 Pouel Kern as the pastor, the father
 Bendt Rothe as Nielsen, parishioner
 Cay Kristiansen as Poul, parishioner
 Lisbeth Movin as the Widow, parishioner
 Preben Lerdorff Rye as the Captain, parishioner 
 Ebbe Rode as Christopher, parishioner
 Else Petersen as Solveig, parishioner
 Asta Esper Andersen as Anna, parishioner
 Holger Perfort as Karlsen, parishioner
 Ebba With as Löwenhielm's aunt
 Axel Strøbye as Löwenhielm's coachman
 Finn Nielsen as grocery store owner
 Ghita Nørby as Narrator (voice)

Production 
Blixen's original story takes place in the Norwegian port town of Berlevåg, albeit in an inaccurate setting of multi-coloured wooden houses on a long fjord. However, when Axel researched locations in Norway, he found the settings were too idyllic and resembled a "beautiful tourist brochure". He shifted the location to the flat windswept coast of western Jutland and asked his set designer, Sven Wichmann, to build a small grey village offering very few or no attractions. Mårup Church, a plain Romanesque church built around 1250 on a remote seaside cliff near the village of Lønstrup, was used as a backdrop. Somewhat ironically, the actual village of Berlevåg is not on a fjord, but directly on the Barents sea, and is subject to strong winds—very much similar to Axel's vision.

Axel altered the setting from a ship-filled harbor to fishermen's rowboats on a beach. He said the changes would highlight Blixen's vision of Babette's life in near complete exile.

The Nordisk Film production company suggested the cast of Babette's Feast should include only Danish actors to reduce production costs. However, Axel wanted Danish, Swedish and French actors to play the roles for the sake of authenticity. Axel was supported by the Danish Film Institute's consultant, Claes Kastholm Hansen, who also agreed the cast should include international stars.
The title character of Babette was initially offered to Catherine Deneuve. Deneuve was interested in the part but was concerned because she had been criticized in her past attempts to depart from her usual ‘sophisticated woman’ roles. While Deneuve deliberated for a day, Axel met with French actress Stéphane Audran. Axel remembered Audran from her roles in Claude Chabrol's films Violette Nozière (1978) and Poulet au vinaigre (1985). When Axel asked Chabrol (her former husband) about Audran's suitability, Chabrol said Audran was the archetype of Babette. Axel gave the script to Audran, told her that Deneuve was contemplating the role, and asked her if she might be able to respond before the next day. Audran called two hours later and said she wanted the role. The following day, Deneuve declined and Audran was officially cast.

Two other major parts were the characters of the elderly maiden sisters, Phillipa and Martine. Phillipa, the once-promising singer, was portrayed by Bodil Kjer, considered the first lady of Danish theater and namesake of the Bodil Award. Birgitte Federspiel, best known for Carl Dreyer's 1955 classic film Ordet, was cast as the staid, lovelorn Martine.

The role of the Swedish General Lorens Löwenhielm, the former suitor of Martine, was accepted by Jarl Kulle and the Swedish Court Lady by Bibi Andersson. Both had achieved international recognition as two of Ingmar Bergman's favorite actors, appearing in many of his films.

The group of elderly villagers was composed of Danish actors, many of whom were well known for their roles in the films of Carl Theodor Dreyer. These included Lisbeth Movin as the Old Widow, Preben Lerdorff Rye as the Captain, Axel Strøbye as the Driver, Bendt Rothe as Old Nielsen and Ebbe Rode as Christopher.

The popular Danish actress Ghita Nørby was cast as the film's narrator. Although production consultants complained to Axel that the use of a narrator was too old-fashioned, Axel was adamant about using one. He said it was not about being old-fashioned but only about the need: "If there is need for a narrator, then one uses one."

Menu 
The seven-course menu in the film consisted of:
 "Potage à la Tortue" (turtle soup) served with Amontillado sherry
 "Blinis Demidoff" (buckwheat pancakes with caviar and sour cream) served with Veuve Cliquot Champagne
 "Cailles en Sarcophage" (quail in puff pastry shell with foie gras and truffle sauce) served with Clos de Vougeot Pinot Noir
 an endive salad
 "Savarin au Rhum avec des Figues et Fruit Glacée" (rum sponge cake with figs and candied cherries) served with Champagne
 assorted cheeses and fruits served with Sauternes
 coffee with vieux marc Grande Champagne cognac.

Reception 
Upon its release in 1987, Babette's Feast received positive reviews. The film won the 1987 Best Foreign Language Film at the Academy Awards. It also received the BAFTA Film Award for Best Foreign Language Film. In Denmark, it won both the Bodil and Robert awards for Best Danish Film of the Year. The film was nominated and/or won several other awards including a Golden Globe nomination, the Grand Prix (Belgian Film Critics Association) award and a Cannes Film Festival special prize.

, the film maintained a 97% approval rating on the Rotten Tomatoes aggregate review website from 34 reviews. After the film's release, several restaurants offered recreations of the film's menu.

The movie is a favorite of Alton Brown, Pope Francis, and Rowan Williams.

American remake 
In December 2019, it was announced that Alexander Payne had been asked to direct an American remake of the film.  Payne's version was planned to be set in Minnesota.

See also 
 List of submissions to the 60th Academy Awards for Best Foreign Language Film
 List of Danish submissions for the Academy Award for Best Foreign Language Film

References

Sources

Further reading 
  Alt URL
 
 
 
 Tibbetts, John C., and James M. Welsh, eds. The Encyclopedia of Novels Into Film (2nd ed. 2005) pp 22–23.

External links 
 
 
 
 
 An extensive collection of links about Babette's Feast at KarenBlixen.com
 Babettes gæstebud at the Danish Film Institute (in Danish)
 Voted #3 on The Arts and Faith Top 100 Films (2010)
Babette’s Feast: “Mercy and Truth Have Met Together” an essay by Mark Le Fanu at the Criterion Collection

1987 films
1987 romantic drama films
Films about Christianity
Danish romantic drama films
1980s Danish-language films
1980s Swedish-language films
1980s French-language films
Films directed by Gabriel Axel
Best Foreign Language Film Academy Award winners
Cooking films
Films about food and drink
Films based on works by Karen Blixen
Films shot in Denmark
Films set in Denmark
Films set in the 19th century
Best Foreign Language Film BAFTA Award winners
Danish Culture Canon
Films based on Danish novels
1987 multilingual films
Danish multilingual films